"When You're Gone" is a song by Irish band the Cranberries. It is the third single from their third studio album, To the Faithful Departed (1996). The music video was directed by Karen Bellone and was released at the end of 1996. The song was first played during the North American leg of the No Need to Argue Tour in late 1994.

Upon its release, the song peaked at number four in Norway, earning a platinum disc there, and reached number 15 in Canada. It additionally peaked within the top 30 in France, Iceland, Ireland, New Zealand, and the United States. In 2017, the song was released as an acoustic, stripped-down version on the band's Something Else album. The song was played at the end of Dolores O'Riordan's funeral on 23 January 2018, following her sudden death a week before in London at the age of 46. It was also played by the majority of Irish radio stations at the same time during the funeral.

Music video
The music video was directed by Karen Bellone. It is mostly in black and white. It features the "yellow room" from the album cover burning over a body of water.

Track listings
Australian and European maxi-CD single
 "When You're Gone"  – 4:33
 "Free to Decide"  – 3:13
 "Sunday"  – 3:22
 "Dreaming My Dreams"  – 4:22
 "Zombie"  – 4:30

US CD single
 "When You're Gone"  – 4:30   
 "Free to Decide"  – 4:24   
 "Free to Decide"  – 3:20   
 "Cordell" – 3:39   
 "Zombie"  – 4:53   
 "Zombie"  – 7:56 
 Screensaver 

European two-track single
 "When You're Gone"  – 4:33
 "I'm Still Remembering"  – 4:32

North American two-track single
 "When You're Gone" – 4:55
 "Free to Decide" – 4:24

Charts

Weekly charts

Year-end charts

Certifications

|}

References

1996 singles
1996 songs
Black-and-white music videos
The Cranberries songs
Island Records singles
Song recordings produced by Bruce Fairbairn
Songs written by Dolores O'Riordan